Churchmead School is a co-educational Church of England voluntary aided secondary school that caters for 11- to 16-year-olds. It is located in Datchet, near Slough, England. The school's motto is "Believe to Achieve". The school has also gained Specialist Arts College status.

In December 2015 Churchmead school was rated as "good" by Ofsted and "outstanding" by a church inspection. Ofsted inspected the school again in 2019 and it continues to be rated as "good".

In 2017 54 per cent of students got grade 4 or above in English and maths. In English 74 per cent got at least a grade 4 and 59 per cent got grade 5 or above.

In 2016 Churchmead got its best ever GCSE results. 69 per cent of pupils got 5 GCSEs including English and maths. 59 per cent of disadvantaged pupils got 5 GCSEs including English and maths. It is now rated in the top 10 per cent of schools nationally for progress.

Churchmead was established as a secondary modern school for Buckinghamshire County Council, who, in the south of the county, operated a system of 11- to 18-year-old secondary schools, fed by 5-11 primary schools (or 5-7 infant schools and 7-11 junior schools). 
Changes to administrative county boundaries in 1974 led to the school transferring to Berkshire County Council, who operated it as a school within Slough's education system, by then modified for the change from primary to secondary education to take place at age 12 rather than 11. Further changes led to the Royal Borough of Windsor and Maidenhead becoming the Education Authority in 1998. The rest of the Windsor area of Windsor and Maidenhead uses a system with age 9-13 middle schools so leaving Churchmead as the only 11-18 school in its area of the borough. This in turn results in most students being drawn from Slough, which has resumed secondary education starting at age 11.

Starting September 2008, the four house system that has been in existence since the school was founded, was scrapped for a three house inter-year form system.

Prefects 
The school maintains a prefect system. Several prefects including a head boy, head girl, deputy head boy, and four deputy head girls.

School links 
Churchmead School is in co-operation with East Berkshire College, this means that sixth form students from both schools can study advanced level courses including media and photography at Churchmead.

References

External links 
 DCSF - Churchmead Church of England (VA) School

Educational institutions established in 1950
Secondary schools in the Royal Borough of Windsor and Maidenhead
1950 establishments in England
Church of England secondary schools in the Diocese of Oxford
Voluntary aided schools in England
Datchet